Daniel L. Kloeffler (born January 1, 1976) is an American television journalist. Since 2010, he has been an anchor of ABC News Now, a cable-news channel of the ABC broadcasting network.

Early life
Kloeffler graduated from Algonac High School in Algonac, Michigan, in 1994. He graduated from the University of New Hampshire in Durham, New Hampshire, in 1999.

Career
He worked at WSTM-TVan NBC-affiliated television station in Syracuse, New Yorkprior to joining MSNBC, a cable-news channel. While at MSNBC, he anchored overnight MSNBC Now news updates as well as MSNBC's First Look and broadcast network NBC's Early Today, both early-morning news programs; Kloeffler left MSNBC in 2009.

In 2010, he became a freelance anchor and correspondent for ABC News, where he anchors on its ABC News Now channel.

References

1976 births
ABC News personalities
American television news anchors
Journalists from Michigan
Journalists from New York City
Living people
American LGBT journalists
Place of birth missing (living people)
MSNBC people
NBC News people
People from Algonac, Michigan
University of New Hampshire alumni
Writers from New Hampshire
LGBT people from Michigan